The 1958 Men's World Weightlifting Championships were held in Stockholm, Sweden from September 16 to September 21, 1958.  There were 96 men in action from 27 nations.

Medal summary

Medal table

References
Results (Sport 123)
Weightlifting World Championships Seniors Statistics

External links
International Weightlifting Federation

World Weightlifting Championships
World Weightlifting Championships
World Weightlifting Championships
International weightlifting competitions hosted by Sweden